Arrapha or Arrapkha (Akkadian: Arrapḫa) was an ancient city in what today is northeastern Iraq, thought to be on the site of the modern city of Kirkuk.

In 1948, Arrapha became the name of the residential area in Kirkuk which was built by the North Oil Company as a settlement for its workers.

History
The first written record of Arrapha is attested from the Neo-Sumerian Empire (c. 22nd to 21st century BC). Ancient Arrapha was a part of Sargon of Akkad's Akkadian Empire (2335–2154 BC), and the city was exposed to the raids of the Lullubi during Naram-Sin's reign.

The city was occupied around 2150 BC by the Gutians. Arrapha was the capital of the short-lived Guti kingdom (Gutium) before it was destroyed and the Gutians driven from Mesopotamia by the Neo-Sumerian Empire c. 2090 BC.

Arrapha was an important trading center in the 18th century BC under Assyrian and Babylonian rule. However, during the 15th and early 14th centuries BC, it was again a largely Hurrian city, the capital of the small Hurrian kingdom of Arrapha, situated along the southeastern edge of the area under Mitanni domination, until it was fully incorporated into Assyria during the Middle Assyrian Empire (1365–1050 BC) after the Assyrians overthrew the Hurri-Mitanni empire.

The city reached great prominence in the 11th and 10th centuries BC as a part of Assyria. In 615 BC, seeing the Assyrians occupied with the Babylonians and violent rebellions among themselves, the Median king Cyaxares successfully invaded Arrapha, which was one of the last strongholds of the Neo-Assyrian Empire. The region later became part of the Persian ruled province of Athura (Achaemenid Assyria).

Arrapha then fell to the Macedonian Empire, where it became a part of Seleucid Syria in its succeeding Seleucid Empire (Syria being an aphetic form of Assyria). Arrapha is mentioned as such until Hellenistic times, at which point the settlement was refounded under the Syriac name Karka.

Between the mid 2nd century BC and mid 3rd century AD, during the Parthian Empire and early Sassanid Empire the site was mentioned in Syriac scripts of christian priest as Beth Garmai, apart from a brief interregnum in the early 2nd century AD when it became a part of the Roman Province of Corduene. The Sassanids conquered the patchwork of independent Assyrian states in the mid to late 3rd century AD, and Arrapha was incorporated into Sassanid-ruled Garmekan until the Arab Islamic conquest of the mid 7th century AD, when Assuristan was dissolved and Arrapha-Karka eventually became Kirkuk.

Arrapha has not been excavated yet, due to its location beneath modern Kirkuk.

See also

Cities of the ancient Near East

References

Sources
 

Ancient Assyrian cities
Hurrian cities